The 1952–1953 St. Francis Terriers men's basketball team represented St. Francis College during the 1952–53 NCAA Division I men's basketball season. The team was coached by Daniel Lynch, who was in his fifth year at the helm of the St. Francis Terriers. The team was a member of the Metropolitan New York Conference and played their home games at the Bulter Street Gymnasium in their Cobble Hill, Brooklyn campus and at the II Corps Artillery Armory in Park Slope, Brooklyn.

The Terriers, while not nationally ranked during the season, received votes from Associated Press balloting.

Roster

Schedule

|-
!colspan=12 style="background:#0038A8; border: 2px solid #CE1126;;color:#FFFFFF;"| Exhibition

|-
!colspan=12 style="background:#0038A8; border: 2px solid #CE1126;;color:#FFFFFF;"| Regular Season

Awards

Vernon Stokes

All-Metropolitan Selection by the Metropolitan Basketball Writers Association

References

External links
 St. Francis Terriers men's basketball official website

St. Francis Brooklyn Terriers men's basketball seasons
St. Francis
Saint Francis
Saint Francis